Alexey Yevgenyevich Petukhov (born 28 June 1983) is a Russian cross-country skier who competed between 2002 and 2019.

Career
His best World Cup finishes were two second places, both in sprint events in 2009, until December 2011, when he won a skate sprint in Davos, Switzerland.  Petukhov also finished ninth in the sprint event at the FIS Nordic World Ski Championships 2009 in Liberec.  
Petukhov won bronze with Nikolay Morilov in the Team Sprint at the 2010 Winter Olympics in Vancouver.  In December 2016, FIS provisionally suspended six Russian cross-country skiers linked to doping violations during the 2014 Winter Olympics, including Petukhov. On 9 November 2017, he was officially disqualified from the 2014 Winter Olympics by the International Olympic Committee.

Cross-country skiing results
All results are sourced from the International Ski Federation (FIS).

Olympic Games
 1 medal – (1 bronze)

World Championships
 2 medals – (1 gold, 1 silver)

World Cup

Season standings

Individual podiums
3 victories – (2 , 1 ) 
17 podiums – (13 , 4 )

Team podiums

4 victories – (4 ) 
8 podiums – (8 )

References

External links
 
 
 

1983 births
Living people
People from Klintsy
Cross-country skiers at the 2010 Winter Olympics
Cross-country skiers at the 2014 Winter Olympics
Olympic cross-country skiers of Russia
Russian male cross-country skiers
Olympic bronze medalists for Russia
Olympic medalists in cross-country skiing
Medalists at the 2010 Winter Olympics
FIS Nordic World Ski Championships medalists in cross-country skiing
Russian sportspeople in doping cases
Doping cases in cross-country skiing
Sportspeople from Bryansk Oblast